Thoridia is a genus of moths belonging to the family Tortricidae. It contains only one species, Thoridia veirsi, which is found in Costa Rica.

See also
List of Tortricidae genera

References

 , in Brown & Powell, 1991, Univ. Calif. Publ. Ent. 111: 24.
 , 2005, World Catalogue of Insects 5

External links
tortricidae.com

Euliini
Tortricidae genera
Monotypic moth genera